Niko Datković (born 21 April 1993) is a Croatian footballer who plays as a centre-back for Cypriot club Nea Salamis Famagusta FC.

Club career
Datković was a regular starter in Rijeka's defense during his first professional year with the club in 2011–12. He made his professional debut on 26 August 2011, aged 18, in Rijeka's home win against Šibenik. In two and a half seasons with Rijeka, he collected 38 caps and scored two goals.

In early 2014, Datković was loaned to Spezia in Italy's Serie B, where he spent the second half of the 2013–14 season and the entire 2014–15 season. He spent the following season on loan with Lugano in the Swiss Super League.

On 3 September 2017, it was revealed that Spezia sent Datković on a season-long loan to CS U Craiova in Romania. On 5 August 2020, he signed with Hungarian club Kisvárda.

On 2 February 2021, Datković moved to the Austrian club Admira Wacker. On 29 January of the following year, he moved to Spanish Segunda División side Mirandés on a short-term deal.

Career statistics

References

External links

1993 births
Living people
Footballers from Rijeka
Croatian footballers
Association football defenders
Croatia youth international footballers
Croatia under-21 international footballers
HNK Rijeka players
Spezia Calcio players
FC Lugano players
CS Universitatea Craiova players
MKS Cracovia (football) players
Kisvárda FC players
FC Admira Wacker Mödling players
CD Mirandés footballers
Nea Salamis Famagusta FC players
Croatian Football League players
Serie B players
Swiss Super League players
Liga I players
Ekstraklasa players
Nemzeti Bajnokság I players
Austrian Football Bundesliga players
Croatian expatriate footballers
Expatriate footballers in Italy
Expatriate footballers in Switzerland
Expatriate footballers in Romania
Expatriate footballers in Poland
Expatriate footballers in Hungary
Expatriate footballers in Austria
Expatriate footballers in Spain
Expatriate footballers in Cyprus
Croatian expatriate sportspeople in Italy
Croatian expatriate sportspeople in Switzerland
Croatian expatriate sportspeople in Romania
Croatian expatriate sportspeople in Poland
Croatian expatriate sportspeople in Hungary
Croatian expatriate sportspeople in Austria
Croatian expatriate sportspeople in Spain
Croatian expatriate sportspeople in Cyprus